Andrew Younghusband (born December 14, 1970 in Canberra, Australia) is a Canadian television personality, writer and journalist best known as the host of the reality shows Canada's Worst Driver, Canada's Worst Handyman, Don't Drive Here and Tougher Than It Looks, as well as the documentary series Tall Ship Chronicles.

Career

Younghusband moved to St. John's, Newfoundland with his family in 1978 and began his career as a stage actor in 1986, then branched out into different media and different formats, including radio and television, filling roles in both writing positions and as an on-air personality. He has worked in serious and comedic roles, as well as documentary, reality and news productions. One of his comedic appearances was an on-stage and television appearance at the Halifax Comedy Festival. His early television writing duties were in comedic environments, but recently, he has written for the two Canada's Worst reality series. Toiling in limited roles through the 1990s, Younghusband made several guest appearances in television series as well as making modest film appearances, several of which placed him on the same sets "rubbing elbows" with notable Canadian (and fellow Newfoundland natives) personalities including Rick Mercer, Cathy Jones and Mary Walsh. In 1999, he was co-creator, writer and actor in the short-lived Canadian series Dooley Gardens, playing the role of Tracy, a homicidal ex-con Zamboni driver. Later that year, he began hosting and co-wrote a Salter Street production called Foodessence, which lasted 65 episodes. The Gemini award-winning Foodessence explored how, why and what we eat through anthropology, social-science, history and science. The reality-based and historical aspects of the show seemed to signal the beginning of a change of direction for Younghusband's career. In 2000, he earned critical acclaim for his role in the film Violet as Carlos, the brilliant, gay son of the title character played by Walsh. The film, set in Newfoundland, was first screened in August at the Montreal World Film Festival. Salter Street was purchased by Alliance Atlantis and after the completion of his work on Foodessence, he signed up to participate in a new Life Network reality TV production called Tall Ship Chronicles. Departing Lunenburg, Nova Scotia in December 2000 on a 19-month, around the world voyage, Younghusband became a crew member of the barque Picton Castle. On board were the captain and nine other professional crew members, along with 35 trainees including Younghusband. Although he was the narrator of the program, he also had to act as bona-fide member of the crew who was required to live under 19th-century conditions. During the voyage, the footage was aired (beginning in June 2001) as a 16-part documentary on Life Network and later on other networks like the UK incarnation of the Travel Channel. Topsail Entertainment, which produced the series, later went on to produce the popular series Trailer Park Boys. Younghusband made a guest appearance as Corporal Anderson on the Topsail-produced series Black Harbour in 1998. Younghusband appeared on CBC Newsworld regularly in a segment called Inside Media, in which he shows a talent for political satire. In 2004, he hosted a national radio show on CBC One and Two called Crank It Up. Following his experiences in the genre, Younghusband has since worked frequently in reality TV. He served as the host and co-writer for the series Canada's Worst Driver, which ran for 14 seasons. He also served as the host and co-writer of Canada's Worst Handyman, which ran for six seasons. In June 2013, while filming Canada's Worst Driver Ever, he began hosting Don't Drive Here, chronicling driving experiences in some of the worst places to drive in the world (Delhi, Bangkok, Mexico City, Manila, Lima and Ulaanbaatar). The show ran for two seasons but was not renewed for a third due to poor ratings.

Personal
Younghusband was born in Canberra, Australia, while his father was attending university there. Younghusband now resides in Toronto, Ontario. Over the course of his life and career, he has visited over 40 countries.

On-screen roles
Understanding Bliss (1990) – Andrew/Father Christmas
Secret Nation (1992) – Brian Peckford #2
Anchor Zone (1994) – Brogan
Dead Silence (1997) – Reporter #1
The Outer Limits TV series: episode "Music of the Spheres" (1997) – D.J.
Black Harbour TV series: episode "Devil and the Deep Blue Sea" (1998) – Corporal Anderson
Blackfly TV Series: pilot (1999) – McTavish
Dooley Gardens TV series (1999) – Tracy
Foodessence Reality TV (1999) – Host
Violet (2000) – Carlos 
Tall Ship Chronicles Reality TV/documentary (2001) – Narrator/crew member
Random Passage miniseries (2002) – Matt Escott
Inside Media News/satire (2004) – Host
Canada's Worst Driver Reality TV (2005–2018) – Host
World's Worst Driver Reality TV special (2005) – Host
Canada's Worst Handyman Reality TV (2006–2011) – Host
Don't Drive Here Reality TV (2013–2015) – Host
How Hard Can It Be? Reality TV (2015) – Host
Tougher Than It Looks Reality TV (2016–present) – Host

Writing credits
Undercurrents writer
Foodessence co-writer
Tall Ship Chronicles writer
Ultimate Survival:Everest writer
X-Quest writer
Inside Media writer
Canada's Worst Driver co-writer
World's Worst Driver co-writer
Canada's Worst Handyman co-writer
Blueprint for Disaster head writer

Awards and nominations
Nominated: Gemini (1998), Best Writing in an Information Program or Series for Undercurrents

References

External links
 
  Biography.
 
Episode summary of Tall Ship Chronicles
Bio on Discovery channel
CBC Video clip of Younghusband from 2004 (RealMedia)

1970 births
Living people
Canadian male comedians
Canadian male television actors
20th-century Canadian screenwriters
Participants in Canadian reality television series
Writers from St. John's, Newfoundland and Labrador
Canadian television writers
Male actors from Newfoundland and Labrador
Canadian male television writers
Comedians from Newfoundland and Labrador
20th-century Canadian male writers
21st-century Canadian screenwriters
21st-century Canadian male writers
Canadian male screenwriters